The broadhead catshark (Bythaelurus clevai) is a catshark of the family Scyliorhinidae. The only specimen, the holotype, was found off Madagascar at a depth between 425 and 500 m.

References

 

broadhead catshark
Fish of Madagascar
broadhead catshark
Taxonomy articles created by Polbot